Aa microtidis is a species of orchid in the genus Aa.

It was described by Rudolf Schlechter in 1922. The type specimen was collected from rock outcroppings at Puna Patanca, Tarija, Bolivia. Schlechter found that it resembled Aa calceata, but with much smaller flowers.

References

microtidis
Plants described in 1922